Désintégrations, for 17 musical instruments and computer generated tape (1982–83) is a musical composition of spectral music by Tristan Murail, commissioned for IRCAM, Paris. The piece is more discontinuous than Murail's earlier composition Gondwana, owing in part to the use of dramatic silences throughout and particularly in the 6th section. According to Julian Anderson, 

Curtis Roads has said that "three compositions produced in the 1980s stand as good examples of compositional manipulation of analysis data: Mortuos Plango, Vivos Voco (1981) by Jonathan Harvey, Désintegrations (1983, Salabert Trajectoires) by Tristan Murail, and Digital Moonscapes (1985, CBS/Sony) by Wendy Carlos."

The piece has been recorded by the Ensemble l'Itinéraire.

See also
Synchronisms

Sources

External links
"Tristan Murail: Gondwana; Désintégrations; Time and Again", AllMusic.com.

Chamber music compositions
Computer music compositions
Spectral music